Protégé: The Battle for the Big Artista Break is a 2012 reality TV series created by GMA Network. This show is the second season of Protégé where Krizza Neri won in 2011. Unlike the previous season, the age limit was set from 13 to 21 years old to find new acting talent. The show premiered on July 23, 2012 (Inside Protégé) and hosted by Jennylyn Mercado and under the direction of Albert Langitan, while the Protégé Gala Night premiered on August 5, 2012 and presented by Dingdong Dantes, together with Carla Abellana and Maxene Magalona. The gala nights were directed by Rommel Gacho.

Overview

According to the show's fan page, there will be a "new kind of battle". Rumor has it that the incoming season will feature the other talent like acting or dancing and eventually will be an artista search like StarStruck did and it turned out to be true.

The show followed the same format as the previous season, except that it was no longer a singing competition but a talent artista search. Aspirants from ages 13 to 21 were filtered until two winners emerge - one male and one female protégé. In this battle, they were looking for a total package - an artist who can sing, dance, act and possess that charismatic appeal over TV. Like the first Protégé competition, this season had judges/mentors who were responsible for training and mentoring the chosen candidates.

Twenty contestants were then selected from thousands of hopefuls. These 20 potential artists lived in the Protégé house complete with amenities including bedrooms for each contestant, a living room, dining area with a 20 seating capacity, a rehearsal area where they could practice dancing, singing and acting, and a confession room where they were asked to explain themselves in case of issues within the house or if a task was to be assigned privately. They also battled it out head to head for audience votes. The Protégé house was blessed and featured over the news of GMA Network long before the contestants resided there.

The winner received a 5-year contract with GMA Network.

Judges, mentors and coaches

Judges
 Joey de Leon
 Bert de Leon
 Annette Gozon-Abrogar
 Cherie Gil

Mentors

There were five confirmed mentors for this season with their assigned location.
 Ricky Davao—Northern and Central Luzon
 Roderick Paulate—Mega Manila
 Gina Alajar—Southern Luzon
 Jolina Magdangal—Visayas
 Phillip Salvador—Mindanao

Coaches
Aside from their respective mentors who served as their guardian all the way through their journey, the protégés had coaches who also helped them improve their chosen craft.
 Voice — Sushi Reyes
 Dancing — Joe Abuda
 Personality development — Floy Quintos
 Acting — Maryo J. de los Reyes and Yanni Yuzon with Pen Medina
 Fitness — Al Galang
 Showbiz values & formation — German Moreno

Auditions

Auditions took place in the following cities:

  The original schedule of auditions in SM Sucat is May 20, 2012
  The original schedule of auditions in SM Mall of Asia is June 20–21, 2012

After the city auditions, Protégé also gave the hopefuls an alternative way to audition via online.

Semifinalists
After a series of auditions, a mentor chose eight hopefuls from the shortlist and those who passed from the online auditions. These eight aspiring protégés, which were composed of four boys and four girls, were called to come back for the final deliberation to determine the official four protégés. The other four protégés who were not chosen were eliminated.

The twenty semifinalists who failed to advance in the finals are as follows:

Finalists
Originally, there were four protégés per mentor for this season, totaling twenty protéges. However, during the first week of Top 10, each mentor chose one of his or her remaining protegés to stay under his or her guidance. The protégés who were not chosen were later picked by other mentors, making a new protégé-mentor tandem.

The twenty finalists were confirmed as follows:

Key:
 – Winner
 – Runner-up

Weekly episodes

Elimination chart
Color key:

Mentor Key:
 – Gina Alajar
 – Ricky Davao
 – Jolina Magdangal
 – Roderick Paulate
 – Phillip Salvador

 There was no elimination held but the Bottom 2 from each region were chosen.
 The bottom two protégés (from each region) competed between each other to defend their slot.
 The challenge winners were the protégés who received special awards and were granted an immunity from elimination for that week.
 As part of the shock, the mentors had to choose a new protege from the other "mentor less proteges" who performed that night. The gala night was a non-elimination night.
 That gala night was already the first part of The Final Battle.

Awards and nominations
 10th Golden Screen TV Awards 2013
Outstanding Original Reality Competition Program Host Winner- Dingdong Dantes
 27th PMPC Star Awards for Television 2013
Best Reality Competition Program - Pending
Best Reality Competition Program Hosts - Pending Nominees: Dingdong Dantes, Jennylyn Mercado, Carla Abellana, Maxene Magalona

See also
 StarStruck (Philippine TV series)
 Are You the Next Big Star?
 Pinoy Idol
 Pinoy Pop Superstar
 List of programs broadcast by GMA Network

References

2012 Philippine television seasons
Protégé (TV series)